is a Japanese manga series by Osora, serialized online via pixiv Comic website since 2014. It has been collected in ten tankōbon volumes by Media Factory. An anime television series adaptation by Silver Link aired from July 7 to September 22, 2019.

Synopsis
A series of strange disappearances have been occurring throughout Japan, and despite the police's efforts, no leads have been found apart from the fact that all of the victims were youths. Akatsuki Iride, a friendly and amicable teenage boy, is a popular uploader of "Let's Play" videos, one of his latest uploads consisting of an F2P game called "The Ones Within - Genome". Although online rumors claim that the game causes anyone who clears it to disappear, Akatsuki is wholly unaware until the rumors prove true. He is summoned to a completely different world, and meets other teenagers like him: Karin Sarayashiki, Kaikoku Onigasaki, Himiko Inaba, Anya Kudou, Yuzu Roromori, Zakuro Oshigiri and Makino Aikawa. The eight teenagers are welcomed into what is known as the 13th Avenue, headed over by a strange man with an alpaca mask calling himself "Paca", and are informed of their task: to work together in clearing stages of the game and retrieving the "chromosome", a keycard-like token of completion, to subsequently reach 100 million viewers in this livestream where death and injury can all occur. Resistance is not tolerated; those who do are imprisoned in what is known as the "White Room" to wait alone for the rest in the Avenue to complete the game. Henceforth begins their trials in clearing this game, but what lies in wait for them is not only dangerous obstacles, with each member having a hidden past and dark secrets of their own.

Characters

 A friendly and optimistic let's player specializing in escape games and the main protagonist of the story. He was raised by his aunt as her son after the former went delusional from the original Akatsuki's death as a child. Before being adopted, his original name was Akira. Despite his positive demeanour he possesses a uniquely perceptive and honest side, which allows him to befriend almost anyone. Prior to the series, he had met Yuzu online and planned to collaborate with her on a game broadcast. 
His identity as the owner of the island where the game takes place is later revealed in the story, as his adoptive father had passed it to him via inheritance after death, although this is kept a secret. 

 A beautiful and popular horror-game streamer hailed as the #1 Female Game Streamer People Want to be Stepped on by online, known as "the Cursed Princess". Despite coming across as initially aggressive and confrontational, she is actually easily scared despite being an avid player of horror games, and can be sensitive and caring to her friends. She becomes Yuzu's best female friend.
As a child, Karin had an older brother who ran away after their parents placed too much expectation and responsibility on him, leaving to pursue his own dreams. This led to their parents putting all these expectations on Karin instead, which made her resent her brother and despise reality. 

 A Sengoku-period and Japanese-style game uploader. Characterised as a laid-back and calm person, he is extremely capable when the need arises and has high responsive abilities, making him the most cut-out for unexpected situations. As the heir to the Onigasaki clan his grandfather placed extreme pressure and expectations on him, treating him like a doll and causing him to disown his family, running away from homes and turning to games to relieve his emotions. He almost always wears Japanese-style clothing and fights with an olden-style umbrella and a katana.

 A fighter-game uploader, which suits his often angry, distrustful and violent attitude. This attitude partially stems from the deaths of his parents and a sleep disorder which gives him regular periods of insomnia, causing him to have to take sleeping pills most of the time and take up game streaming to get rid of boredom during the night. He eventually befriends Akatsuki, but quarrels a lot with Zakuro throughout the series. 
Anya was the youngest of three brothers until his oldest brother Kenya died after falling asleep from their family's sleep disorder on his motorcycle. Not long after, Anya was also diagnosed with the same disorder, leading to the second brother Shinya to aspire to become a doctor and develop a cure. Anya keeps his brother's motorcycle helmet around his neck as a memento. 

A stealth-type game uploader, characterised by his masked mouth and ability to conceal his presence well even in real life. He is often stoic, but harbours a shy side especially around women, which makes him a target of Yuzu's teasing. He entered the game in order to find his younger twin sister Sakura after she disappeared under similar circumstances. He has trouble working with Anya and keeps a dagger in his jacket for self-defense.

 A timid and kind nurturing-simulation game streamer who often helps out with domestic chores during emergencies. She carries flash grenades around for self-defense. Her older brother was put up for adoption by her parents and later went missing long enough to be declared legally deceased. Her parents claimed they did this to protect her which lead her to believe that she had indirectly killed him.

 A cheerful puzzle-and-maze-game streamer that enjoys teasing her teammates, especially Karin. She met Akatsuki online before and the two were planning to do a collaboration together before entering the game. Underneath her ditzy and sarcastic personality though, she harbours a genius-like intellect and an unhealthy obsession with Akatsuki.

 A quiet and handsome love-game streamer who sleeps almost all the time and lets his eyes do most of the talking for him. When he was a child, he was never loved by his parents and fell in love with the girl next door who took care of him for a long time, but his hopes were dashed when the girl, who never knew of his true feelings, got a boyfriend herself. This led him to turn to love games for comfort and shut himself in his own world. Later, Akatsuki helps get him back on his feet and move on. A running gag in the series is how anyone, male or female, who looks into his eyes for five seconds can be charmed by him.

 The mysterious game master of The Ones Within - Genome. He hides his face behind an alpaca mask. Despite his jovial and light-hearted personality, he can show a darker and more serious side whenever he faces opposition from any of the players.

 He was the elder brother of both Anya and Shinra. Kenya was going to get chocolate for his brothers but Kenya died in a car crash after falling asleep from their family's sleep disorder on his motorcycle and his younger brother Anya keeps his motorcycle helmet around his neck as a memento.

Media

Manga

Anime
An anime adaptation was announced via the manga's official Twitter account on May 23, 2018, later revealed to be a television series on September 13, 2018. The series is directed by Shin Oonuma and animated by Silver Link, with Kento Shimoyama written the scripts, Mizuki Takahashi designed the characters, and Junichi Satou of Fhána composed the music at Lantis. It aired from July 7 to September 22, 2019 on AT-X, Tokyo MX, KBS, SUN, BS11, and TVA. Anya's Japanese voice actor, Tasuku Hatanaka, performed the series' opening theme song "not GAME", while Fhána performed the series' ending theme song . Funimation has licensed the series out Asia for a simuldub, while Muse Communication holds the rights to the series in Southeast Asia. The series ran for 12 episodes. An original video animation has been announced, and was bundled with the manga's 10th volume which was released on February 27, 2020.

Reception
The anime adaptation's first episode garnered poor reviews from Anime News Network's staff during the Summer 2019 season previews. James Beckett felt the gimmicky premise lacked meaningful content and only carried "by-the-numbers" storytelling and "purely functional" animation, saying it lacks the "charm, inventiveness, and fun" of the Danganronpa franchise; Rebecca Silverman was critical of the show not accentuating the strengths of its premise and being undecided of its genre but was optimistic of its improved growth based on the familiar plot; Theron Martin criticized the premise for having no "entertainment value" and not giving an explanation of its overall world filled with uninteresting characters. The fourth reviewer, Nick Creamer, praised Shin Oonuma's direction for adding "visual diversity" to the episode but criticized the overall bland artwork and unsalvageable story for carrying "archetypal" characters that deliver "simplistic and obnoxious" comedy. Fellow ANN editor Caitlin Moore reviewed the complete anime series in 2020. She commended the show's "visual panache" for delivering atmospheric horror in its episodes but felt it wasn't enough for this "poorly-written Danganronpa imitator" to distract viewers from its "subpar script" having "poor pacing", tonal inconsistencies and unmemorable characters to engage with throughout a story that gives a "non-ending" for its conclusion, concluding that "[I]t never tries to stand on its own merits, which are few and far between. It is, in a word, bad."

References

External links
  
 

2019 anime television series debuts
2020 anime OVAs
Anime series based on manga
Funimation
Isekai anime and manga
Japanese webcomics
Kadokawa Dwango franchises
Media Factory manga
Muse Communication
Shōjo manga
Silver Link
Webcomics in print